Karl Freiherr von Fischer-Treuenfeld (31 March 1885 – 7 June 1946) was a German Waffen-SS commander.  A brigade commander during the Nazi era, during the invasion of the Soviet Union, he commanded the 2 SS Infantry Brigade and the 1 SS Infantry Brigade, which engaged in the killing of Jews, communists and partisans (bandits). Treuenfeld later commanded the SS Division Frundsberg. He committed suicide in 1946 whilst in American custody.

Career
Born in 1885, Treuenfeld enlisted in the Prussian Army in 1904. He studied at the War Academy until 1914, and then served during World War I. He was transferred to the General staff in December 1915 and later served on the staff of the field army of General Erich Ludendorff. After the end of the war he was the commander of the militia units in the Hamburg area. In 1922, he was introduced to Adolf Hitler by General Ludendorff and organised the militia to assist Hitler during the Beer Hall Putsch. In 1929, Treuenfeld's business failed which he blamed on the Jews, writing in his biography: "As a result, the hate of the Jews and freemasons that caused the economic disaster... caused my business to collapse." In April 1939, he joined the SS.

In January 1941, Treuenfeld was appointed the SS and Police Leader of the Waffen-SS in the Northwest and West, until April 1941, when he was given command of the 2 SS Infantry Brigade, which started forming in May 1941 for Operation Barbarossa. He remained as the commander of the 2 SS Infantry Brigade until July 1942, when he took over command of the 1 SS Infantry Brigade. Both these brigades conducted rear-area security operations and the killing of Jews and other groups.

Treuenfeld continued to hold the position of SS and Police Leader of Waffen-SS North East between April 1941 to December 1941. From December 1941 to September 1942 he held the same position for Bohemia and Moravia, and served the deputy of Reinhard Heydrich. After the assassination of Heydrich in Operation Anthropoid on 27 May 1942, the men responsible, Jan Kubiš, Jozef Gabčík and others, were betrayed and trapped in the crypt of Ss. Cyril and Methodius Cathedral in Prague. Treuenfeld was in command of the troops that stormed the church on 18 June 1942, only to find that after holding out for hours they had committed suicide.

A difference in opinion between Treuenfeld and the Gestapo led to his replacement and transfer at the end of 1942. He then took up the post of commander of the Waffen-SS in Southern Russia and the Ukraine from February to November 1943. In November 1943, now promoted to Gruppenführer, he took over command of the SS Panzer Division Frundsberg, but was relieved of command after receiving another severe wound in the battles of Tarnopol on 22 April 1944.  After recovering he became the SS leader in the SS Main Office and the Befehlshaber  of the Waffen SS in Italy. Treuenfeld committed suicide on 7 June 1946 whilst a prisoner of the American Army at Steinlager Allendorf prisoner-of-war camp.

See also
List of SS-Gruppenführer

References

1946 deaths
1885 births
SS and Police Leaders
Reinhard Heydrich
Waffen-SS personnel
SS-Gruppenführer
German prisoners of war in World War II held by the United States
German people who died in prison custody
Prisoners who died in United States military detention
Nazis who committed suicide in Germany
Nazis who committed suicide in prison custody